Lepasta is a genus of moths of the family Notodontidae.

Selected species
Lepasta bractea (Felder, 1874)
Lepasta grammodes Felder, 1874
Lepasta majorina Dognin, 1914

References

Notodontidae